John Brand (19 August 1744 – 11 September 1806) was an English antiquarian and Church of England clergyman. He was author of Observations on Popular Antiquities: including the whole of Mr Bourne's “Antiquitates Vulgares,” with addenda to every chapter of that work.

Life

Born in Washington, County Durham, he was educated at the Royal Grammar School and Lincoln College, Oxford. Initially apprenticed as a cordwainer,  he obtained a degree from Lincoln College, Oxford, in 1775 and was appointed perpetual curate of Cramlington.
Brand was appointed Secretary to the Society of Antiquaries of London in 1784 and was annually re-elected until his death.

He was buried in the nearby churchyard of St Mary-at-Hill. When this churchyard was cleared, his remains were moved to West Norwood Cemetery within the enclosure that the church acquired there in 1847.

Works
Brand wrote Observations on the popular antiquities of Great Britain: Including the Whole of Mr. Bourne's Antiquitates Vulgares (1777), generally referred to as Popular Antiquities. (The incorporated work was the Popular Antiquities of Henry Bourne, published 1725, with Brand's own extensive annotations). Material from it was afterwards broadly incorporated into William Hone's Every Day Book, Year Book, etc., and in Chambers' Book of Days, which had wide popular circulation. The Popular Antiquities were further revised and enlarged by Sir Henry Ellis. The expression "popular antiquities" was overtaken in the 19th century by "folklore". The book was again reworked as an alphabetical dictionary in Faiths and folklore ; a dictionary of national beliefs, superstitions and popular customs, (1905) by William Carew Hazlitt.

References

Short biography", St Andrew's Church", British History Online (see footnote 33)
Observations on Popular Antiquities, Chiefly Illustrating the Origin of our Vulgar Customs, Ceremonies and Superstitions by John Brand: A New Edition with the additions of Sir Henry Ellis (Chatto and Windus, London 1900). (This pre-dates the alphabetical extension, revision and correction accessed below.)
 R. H. Sweet, ‘Brand, John (1744–1806)’, Oxford Dictionary of National Biography

External links
 

English antiquarians
Fellows of the Society of Antiquaries of London
People from Washington, Tyne and Wear
1744 births
1806 deaths
People educated at the Royal Grammar School, Newcastle upon Tyne
Burials at West Norwood Cemetery
18th-century English Anglican priests
19th-century English Anglican priests